Davide Ghirlandaio (1452–1525), also known as David Ghirlandaio and as Davide Bigordi, was an Italian painter and mosaicist, active in his native Florence.

His brothers Benedetto Ghirlandaio (1458–1497) and Domenico Ghirlandaio (1449–1494) were both painters, as was his nephew Ridolfo Ghirlandaio (1483–1561).
Davide was an assistant to, and then a partner of, his brother, the leading painter Domenico.  After Domenico's death, Davide took over the studio and trained Domenico's son Ridolfo. He was active in the mosaic decoration of the Orvieto Cathedral.

References 
 Dizionario enciclopedico Bolaffi dei pittori e degli incisori italiani dall'XI al XX secolo, Turin, Giulio Bolaffi, 1972–1976.
 Vasari, Giorgio, Le Vite delle più eccellenti pittori, scultori, ed architettori, many editions and translations.

 

15th-century Italian painters
Italian male painters
16th-century Italian painters
Painters from Florence
Italian Renaissance painters
1452 births
1525 deaths